Anthodioctes camargoi is a species of bee discovered in 1999. No subspecies are listed at the Catalogue of Life.

References

Megachilidae
Insects described in 1999